Malahat Ibrahimgizi (born 25 April 1958) is an Azerbaijani politician. She has been a member of the National Assembly from the New Azerbaijan Party since 2000. She has served as a member of the NATO Parliamentary Assembly since 2006 and is a member of the Euronest Parliamentary Assembly.

Early life 
She was born in Vardenis district in the Armenian Soviet Socialist Republic.

References 

1958 births
Living people
Members of the National Assembly (Azerbaijan)
Women members of the National Assembly (Azerbaijan)
21st-century Azerbaijani women politicians
21st-century Azerbaijani politicians
Armenian Azerbaijanis
Members of the NATO Parliamentary Assembly